Jason Stewart Hart (born 5 September 1990) is an English professional footballer who plays as a forward.

Career
Hart came through the youth ranks at local club Blackburn Rovers, though would depart without first-team experience and would subsequently take a football break. After a trial with Accrington Stanley, Hart would return with Rossendale United before featuring in the Accrington Combination League with Church Town. A move to Colne would follow, where he'd score over twenty goals in the 2012–13 North West Counties Football League Premier Division. Hart had a stint with Padiham after leaving Colne, prior to signing with Clitheroe in 2014. He spent one season with the Northern Premier League Division One North club, before being sacked.

In 2015, Hart rejoined Colne for a second spell. Thirty-four goals would follow in the 2015–16 NWCFL as Colne won the title and promotion to the Northern Premier League division that he played in for Clitheroe. In June 2016, Hart secured a contract across the competition with recently relegated Ramsbottom United. Upon leaving Ramsbottom, Hart appeared for Nelson and, for a second time, Padiham. October 2017 saw Hart head to Northwich Victoria of the NWCFL. However, the forward would return to Padiham in the succeeding March. He would be on the move again within months, penning terms with Longridge Town.

Hart, after thirty goals for Longridge, switched England for Bhutan in June 2019, as he joined Premier League side Thimphu City; managed by fellow Englishman Josh Shepherd. He scored on his competitive debut against Druk Star, with another goal following in his second match versus Paro. Hart scored twenty goals and assisted nine more for Thimphu City. Hart departed at the end of 2019, subsequently joining I-League team Punjab. He departed Punjab in January 2020 after five appearances. Soon after, Hart signed with Australian Victorian State League Division 2 outfit Doncaster Rovers.
On 9 May 2021, Hart debuted for NPL side St Albans Saints.

Personal life
In April 2015, Hart was dismissed by Clitheroe F.C. after he was recorded having sex with a woman in the away dugout while wearing their training kit after a league match. The video was circulated widely across social media.  Anne Barker, chairwoman of Clitheroe, said Hart brought the club into disrepute and he was sacked following the incident.

He separated from his partner and moved overseas shortly after the incident.

Hart has one son, Lucas (born October 2011).

Honours
Colne
North West Counties Football League Premier Division: 2015–16

Longridge Town
North West Counties Football League Division One North: 2018–19

References

External links

 Jay Hart Interview

1990 births
Living people
People from Oswaldtwistle
English footballers
Association football forwards
Rossendale United F.C. players
Colne F.C. players
Padiham F.C. players
Clitheroe F.C. players
Ramsbottom United F.C. players
Nelson F.C. players
Northwich Victoria F.C. players
Longridge Town F.C. players
Thimphu City F.C. players
North West Counties Football League players
Northern Premier League players
I-League players
English expatriate footballers
English expatriate sportspeople in Bhutan
English expatriate sportspeople in India
Expatriate footballers in Bhutan
Expatriate footballers in India